Rain City may refer to the following cities:

Seattle, USA
Rasht, Iran
Vancouver, Canada
Pittsburgh, USA
Bogor, Indonesia
Taiping, Perak, Malaysia
Keelung, Taiwan
Manchester, UK

See also
Rain City (band)
Rain City Superhero Movement
Nicknames of Vancouver
Trouble in Mind (film)
 Rain (disambiguation)
 Raintown (disambiguation)
 Rainville (disambiguation)
 Rainberg (Austria)